The Occitans are a Romance-speaking ethnic group originating in the historical region of Occitania (southern France, northeastern Spain, and northwestern Italy). They have been also called Gascons, Provençals, and Auvergnats.

The Occitan language is still used to varying levels by between 100,000 and 800,000 speakers in southern France and northern Italy. Since 2006, the Occitan language is recognized as one of the official languages in Catalonia, an autonomous region of Spain.

The Occitans are concentrated in Occitania, but also in big urban centres in neighbouring regions: Lyon, Paris, Turin, and Barcelona. There are also ethnic Occitans in Guardia Piemontese (Calabria), as well as Argentina, Mexico, and the United States.

See also

 Languedoc
 Septimania
 Mediterranean
 Hachmei Provence
 Iberia
 Catharism
 Albigensian Crusade
 Grimaldi Man
 Aquitani
 Iberians

References

Occitania
 
Romance peoples
Ethnic groups in France
Ethnic groups in Italy
Ethnic groups in Spain